Jaleshwar is a municipality in Janakpur Zone, Nepal, and the headquarters of Mahottari District of Madhesh Province in Nepal.

Jaleshwarnath

This place is famous for the holy temple of Jaleshwarnath Mahadev, dedicated to Lord Shiva. Jaleswar is the second largest business center in Mahottari District, Nepal. Given the importance of the temple, the place is named after it. This place witnesses a huge gathering in the month of Shravan [July–August] as this month is dedicated to Lord Shiva and  his consort Goddess Parvati. This place is also famous for goddess Sansari Mai which is situated in the centre of Jaleshwornagar.

Lifestyle
Temperature highly affects the lifestyle of Jaleshwar. Due to extreme heat in summer season, people wear light cotton clothes and rarely come out during the day time. While in the winter season, the temperature may drop to 10-15 °C during which people wear thick woollen clothes.

Restaurants and hotels in Jaleshwar are famous for its samosas, chaat, golgappas, dahibada, momos (Nepalese-style Dumplings), sekuwa (roasted spiced-meat). Samosas, chaat, katti roll, golgappas and sekuwa from Jaleshwar are considered to be the most delicious in this region. It is also famous for peeda (milk item).

The city also has religious significance. Jaleshwarnath Temple is a renowned temple for Hindu devotees in the country as well as those from nearest border cities of India.

Geography
Jaleshwar is located in the Mahottari District in the south-eastern Region of Nepal (Terai region), with a total population of 23533. The climate is subtropical and the temperature varies between a maximum of 42 °C and minimum of 12 °C. People of jaleshwor wear dhoti kurta pajama and women wear Saree blouse. Due to the Indian border, there are many people attract in western culture.

Transportation
Jaleshwar is located 15 km south of Janakpur. Jaleshwar has fully operational bus and mini-bus services that reach almost all parts of this region that connected by roadways, almost including all the major hubs in the country. The main hub for buses is Jaleshwar Buspark, while small transits are located in several other places in the city like Buddhajibi chok, maccha bazar. Short routes are generally covered by e-rickshaw and mini-bus, while luxury coaches are available for long routes to destinations like Kathmandu, Birgunj, etc. The country's longest highway – Mahendra Highway – is linked from the city center. 

Indian and Nepalese nationals may cross the border without restrictions; however, there is a customs checkpoint for goods and third-country nationals.

The most common public transport for commuters within the city have long been cycle rickshaws and electric rickshaws. Most common private transport are motorcycles, especially among young adults while bicycles are used by many. Recently the number of automobiles has increased.

Trade

This place is fastest growing trade centre of Nepal. There are some small and medium scale industries also. As it is situated near the border of India, the main trade of this place is with Indian market. Nepal Government has planned to make this place as business hub of Nepal.

Business
The place has growing business as it is border to India. Number of "A class" banks has opened its branched to Jaleshwor. Currently, there is 5 "A class" banks – Prabhu Bank, Century Bank, Laxmi Bank, Rastriya Banijya Bank and Agriculture Development Bank. There are several money transfer agencies like Mishika Enterprises, Monu Money Express, Shail Enterprites. Everest Bank Ltd, is also going to open its new branch at Pipra Bazar, which is close to Jaleshwor (between Jaleshwor & Janakpur road).

Education
ALHEBS (Advance Learners Himalayan English Boarding Secondary School)

References

Mahottari District
Populated places in Mahottari District
Transit and customs posts along the India–Nepal border
Municipalities in Madhesh Province
Nepal municipalities established in 1982